The Blayais Nuclear Power Plant is a nuclear plant on the banks of the Gironde estuary near Blaye, France operated by Électricité de France.

Description
The power plant has 4 pressurized water reactors – producing 951 MW gross and 910 MW net each. They were commissioned from 1981 to 1983. The plant has 1200 EDF employees and 350 permanent workers.

The four reactors produce about 25 TWh per year which is about 5% of the total electricity consumption in France (2015: 476 TWh). Since its commissioning, the Blayais nuclear power plant has produced more than 800 TWh, nearly twice the equivalent of the French electricity production in one year.

In its 2016 annual report, the Nuclear Safety Authority (ASN) finds that "the nuclear safety and environmental protection performance of the Blayais NPP on the whole matches ASN's general assessment of EDF and that it's radiation protection performance stands out positively", but asked for "more effective management of the nuclear waste produced during reactor outages".

Selected incidents

1999 flooding

On the evening of 27 December 1999, a combination of the incoming tide and high winds overwhelmed the sea walls at the plant and causing parts of the plant to be flooded. The event resulted in the loss of the plant's off-site power supply and knocked out several safety-related backup systems, resulting in a 'level 2' event on the International Nuclear Event Scale.

At the time, units 1, 2 and 4 were at full power, while unit 3 was shut down for refuelling. The operation of units 1 and 2 were affected by flood damage to a number of water pumps and distribution panels, all four units lost their 225 kV power supplies, while units 2 and 4 also lost their 400 kV power supplies. Diesel backup generators were employed to maintain power to plants 2 and 4 until the 400 kV supply was restored. Over the following days an estimated  of water was pumped out of the flooded buildings.

On 5 January, the regional newspaper Sud-Ouest ran the following headline without being contradicted: "Very close to a major accident", explaining that a catastrophe had been narrowly avoided.

The flooding resulted in fundamental changes to the evaluation of flood risk at nuclear power plants, and in the precautions taken.

In Germany the flooding prompted the Federal Ministry for Environment, Nature Conservation and Nuclear Safety to order an evaluation of the German nuclear power plants.

Opposition

The continued operation of the Blayais plant is opposed by the local anti-nuclear group 'TchernoBlaye' (a portmanteau of the French spelling of Chernobyl and Blaye, the nearest town), formed by Stéphane Lhomme on 15 December 1999.

References

External links

 website (with environmental survey link)

Nuclear power stations in France
Civilian nuclear power accidents
Électricité de France